The Fischbach Alps are part of the Prealps East of the Mur.

Location and countryside 
The Fischbach Alps are a gentle, elongated mountain range in the Alps, with the character of a low mountain range and covered in forests and Alpine meadows. They are located in the Styria in Austria, south of the Mürz. They are the eastern outliers of the Central Alps and part of the Styrian Prealps.

They extend from the water gap of the Mur in the west to the Feistritz Saddle in the east. Their highest summit is the Stuhleck. Other high points are the Pretul (1,656 m) and Amundsenhöhe (1,666 m), the Teufelstein (1,498 m), the Stanglalpe (1,490 m), the Sauernkogel (1,451 m), the Steinriegel (1,577 m), the Hochschlag (1,580 m) and the Rennfeld (1,629 m).

Culture 
The mountains are named after the village of Fischbach.

In the Fischbach Alps lies Alpl (in the municipality of Krieglach), the birthplace of Peter Rosegger. In 1998 a broadcast in the ORF series, Klingendes Österreich, highlighted the  Fischbach Alps. Under the title of Gebirge ohne Härte: Die Fischbacher Alpen the programme covered the most important villages and peaks in the Fischbach Alps.

External links 

 
Mountain ranges of Styria
Mur (river)